A complete list of locations that have been the venue of the All-Ireland Fleadh, also known as Fleadh Cheoil na hÉireann:

References

Irish music-related lists
Celtic music groups
All Ireland Fleadh Cheoil